is a Japanese researcher known for discovering lithium cobalt oxide (LiCoO) and related materials for the lithium-ion battery (Li-ion battery). He was affiliated with the University of Tokyo before he went on to work for Toshiba.

Early career
Koichi Mizushima was trained as a physicist at the University of Tokyo and received a PhD in Physics from the University of Tokyo. He worked for 13 years in the Physics Department at the University of Tokyo. In 1977, he was invited by Professor John Goodenough in the Inorganic Chemistry Department at Oxford University to join them as a research scientist. During his stay (1977-1979) at Oxford, Dr. Mizushima, along with John B. Goodenough, discovered LiCoO and related compounds now used for the cathode of the Li-ion battery. He went on to work for Toshiba.

Recognition
 1999 - Kato Memorial Prize
 2007 - Fellow, The Japan Society of Applied Physics
 2016 - NIMS Award (National Institute for Materials Science)
 2019 - The University of Tokyo President's Special Award

References

1941 births
Living people
Japanese chemists
University of Tokyo alumni